Events from the year 1600 in art.

Events
Approximate start date of the Baroque art period.

Works

 Federico Barocci - Quintilia Fischieri (approximate date)
 Caravaggio
The Calling of St Matthew (1599-1600)
The Martyrdom of Saint Matthew (1599-1600)
 El Greco
Christ Driving the Money Changers from the Temple
View of Toledo (1599-1600)
Karel van Mander - The Continence of Scipio
Domenico Passignano - Bathers at San Niccolò

Births
May - Andrea Vaccaro, Italian Caravaggisti painter in a tenebrist style (died 1670)
date unknown
Guido Ubaldo Abbatini, Italian painter (died 1656)
Willem Outgertsz Akersloot, Dutch Golden Age engraver (died 1661)
Filippo d'Angeli, Italian painter of battle scenes with small figures (died 1660)
Gioacchino Assereto, Italian painter, active in Genoa (died 1649)
Antonio Bacci, Italian still life painter (died 1665)
Antonio Barbalonga, Italian painter of the Baroque period (died 1649)
Hans Gillisz. Bollongier, still life Dutch painter (died 1645)
Domenico Bruni, Italian painter, mainly active in Brescia (died 1666)
Bernabé de Ayala, Spanish historical painter (died 1678)
Jacob Duck, Dutch painter (died 1667)
Aniello Falcone, Italian painter noted for his depictions of battle scenes (died 1665)
Giovanna Garzoni, Italian painter of still-lifes of fruits, vegetables, and flowers (died 1670)
Jerónimo Jacinto de Espinosa, Spanish painter active in Valencia (died 1667)
Jean Monier, French painter (died 1656)
Kim Myeong-guk, Korean painter of the mid Joseon period (d. unknown)
Vincenzo Manenti, Italian painter who worked on the cathedral at Tivoli (died 1674)
Jochim Neiman, German-born traveling painter who primarily worked in Finland (died 1673)
Antonio Richieri, Italian painter of frescoes (date of death unknown)
Fray Juan Rizi, Spanish painter (died 1680)
Pieter van Schaeyenborgh, Dutch painter of fish still lifes (died 1657)
Giovanni Serodine, Italian painter in Caravaggisti and tenebrist styles (died 1631)
Cristoforo Serra, Italian painter who was also a militia captain in the Papal troops (died 1689)
Georg Pachmann, Austrian portrait painter (died 1652)
Pieter van Avont, Flemish painter, draughtsman and printmaker (died 1652)
Magdalena van de Passe, engraver and important member of the Van de Passe family of artists (died 1638)
probable
Domenico Ambrogi, Italian painter from Bologna (died 1678)
Giovanni Battista Braccelli, Italian engraver and painter, active in Florence (died 1650)
Jacob Heinrich Elbfas, Livonia-born portraitist (died 1664)
Giuseppe Caletti, Italian painter and engraver (died 1660)
Giulio Cesare Fellini, Italian painter (d. unknown)
Pieter de Grebber, Dutch painter (died 1652/1653)
Philips de Marlier, Flemish Baroque painter and copyist (died 1668)
Pieter Anthonisz. van Groenewegen, Dutch painter and member of the Bentvueghels (died 1658)
Gerard Houckgeest, Dutch Delft School painter (died 1661)
Giovanni Battista Mainero, Italian painter from Genoa (died 1657)
Gerard Soest, Dutch painter, father of Gerard ter Borch (died 1681)
Matthias Stom, Dutch Golden Age painter (died 1649)
Moses van Uyttenbroeck, Dutch painter and etcher (died 1648)
1600/1603: Johannes Cornelisz Verspronck, Dutch portraitist (died 1662)

Deaths
October 17 - Cornelis de Jode, cartographer and engraver (born 1568)
date unknown
Cristoforo Augusta, Italian painter, pupil of Giovanni Battista Trotti (born 1550)
Giovanni Balducci, also called Il Cosci, Italian mannerist painter (born 1560)
Santi Gucci, architect and sculptor (born c.1530)
Diego Polo the Elder, Spanish painter (born 1560)
Simon Pereyns, Flemish painter who worked in Portugal, Spain, and Mexico (born 1530)
Jan Sadeler I, Flemish engraver of the Sadeler family (born 1550)
Decio Termisani, Naples-born Italian painter (born 1565)
Christiaen Jansz van Bieselingen, Dutch Golden Age painter (born 1558)
Petruccio Ubaldini, Italian calligraphist and illuminator on vellum (born 1524)
Giovanni Maria Verdizotti, Venetian artist and poet (born 1525)

 
Years of the 16th century in art
1600s in art